"Too Much on My Heart" is a song written by Jimmy Fortune, and recorded by American country music group The Statler Brothers.  It was released in July 1985 as the second single from the album Pardners in Rhyme.  The song was The Statler Brothers' last of four number ones on the country chart.  The single stayed at number one for one week and spent a total of fourteen weeks on the country chart.

Chart performance

References
 

1985 songs
The Statler Brothers songs
1985 singles
Songs written by Jimmy Fortune
Song recordings produced by Jerry Kennedy
Mercury Records singles